Orlovka is a rural locality (a village) in Yesipovskoye Rural Settlement, Ternovsky District, Voronezh Oblast, Russia. The population was 72 as of 2010.

Geography 
Orlovka is located 11 km northwest of Ternovka (the district's administrative centre) by road. Rusanovo is the nearest rural locality.

References 

Rural localities in Ternovsky District